Thomas Pevsner (2 October 1926 – 18 August 2014) was a British assistant film director and producer whose career spanned more than four decades.

He was the second of three children born to Sir Nikolaus Pevsner, an architectural historian of Russian-Jewish origin. The family emigrated from Germany in 1933 to escape the Nazi regime.

He served in the British Army from 1944 to 1948 before studying modern languages at the University of Cambridge, where he was a member of the St John's College Film Society. He was editor of The Cambridge Review; after graduating he went to work at the Film Finance Corporation.

Tom Pevsner's notable credits include assistant director on The Ladykillers (1955) The Longest Day (1962) and The Private Life of Sherlock Holmes (1970) and as producer for Dracula. He worked as associate, then executive producer on every James Bond film from For Your Eyes Only to GoldenEye. His contribution to the Bond series is acknowledged in the later Bond film Spectre, when Q states that he is staying at a hotel named Pevsner.

He died in 2014 aged 87. He was included in the In Memoriam tribute during the broadcast of the 87th Academy Awards on 22 February 2015.

References

External links

1926 births
2014 deaths
Film people from Dresden
British film producers
Alumni of the University of Cambridge
Jewish emigrants from Nazi Germany to the United Kingdom
English people of German-Jewish descent
English people of Russian-Jewish descent
German people of Russian-Jewish descent
British Army personnel of World War II
German emigrants to England